"Cross My Broken Heart" is a song by American-born pop singer Sinitta. It was released in March 1988 as the sixth and final single from her self-titled debut album (1987). The song was written and produced by Stock Aitken Waterman, and was successful in the UK where it was a top 10 hit, peaking at number six. It was certified silver by the BPI. The B-side cointains a remix of her 1987 hit, "Toy Boy".

Critical reception
James Hamilton from Record Mirror wrote in his dance column, "Plaintively pitched tudding bpm canterer with a sing-song chorus and rather more melody than usual".

Formats and track listings
 7" single
"Cross My Broken Heart" (Remix) – 3:43
"Toy Boy" (7" Remix) – 4:20

 12" single
"Cross My Broken Heart" (Cupid's Avenging Mix) – 6:50
"Toy Boy" (12" Remix) – 5:08
"Cross My Broken Heart" (Instrumental) – 3:43

 12" remix
"Cross My Broken Heart" (Extra Pulsing Mix) – 6:46
"Toy Boy" (12" Remix) – 5:08
"Cross My Broken Heart" (Instrumental) – 3:43

Charts

References

1987 songs
Song recordings produced by Stock Aitken Waterman
Sinitta songs
Songs written by Pete Waterman
Songs written by Matt Aitken
Songs written by Mike Stock (musician)
1988 singles
Fanfare Records singles